Daniel Vheremu (born 18 March 1985) is a retired Zimbabwean football defender.

References

1985 births
Living people
Zimbabwean footballers
Shooting Stars F.C. (Zimbabwe) players
Gunners F.C. players
F.C. Platinum players
Zimbabwe international footballers
Association football defenders
Zimbabwe Premier Soccer League players
Zimbabwe A' international footballers
2011 African Nations Championship players